Hispa ramosa, is a species of leaf beetle native to India, and Sri Lanka.

Description
It is a stout species with blackish pronotum and elytra. There is a more or less distinct brass or cupreous tint. . Pronotal disc is wide and convex. There are large spines found on the first and second antennal segments. Scutellum semicircular, impunctate and bare. Pronotum wide and long. Puncturation regular, and coarse.

References 

Cassidinae
Insects of Sri Lanka
Beetles described in 1817